Berrylands railway station is a National Rail station in the borough of Kingston upon Thames, London.

Location
Berrylands, operated by South Western Railway, is on the South West Main Line. Normally only Hampton Court Branch trains serve it, but in service disruptions Guildford via Cobham trains make special stops here. The station is in Travelcard Zone 5.

The station is on the elevated section of the main line, where it crosses both Norbiton Common and the Hogsmill River, a tributary of the River Thames.

Construction

It was opened on 16 October 1933 to serve large housing developments, which gave the station its name. 90% of the cost of the station was financed by the local developers to enhance the attractiveness of the new estate to commuters.

A modern ground level station (1969) is connected by stairs to the platforms, which are on the outer tracks of the four-track main line. Berrylands is one of the few stations around the London area still constructed with wooden platforms.

Service

The typical off-peak service from the station is:

Places of Interest 
Berrylands is home to the Raeburn Open Space (known locally as the Berrylands Nature Reserve).

History

From the start of services at the station until June 1967, there was one fast rush hour service to Waterloo at 8:07 a.m.  This train was the 7:30 a.m from Guildford via Cobham.  It called at Surbiton at 8:04 then New Malden at 8:10.  At Raynes Park it switched to the fast line and called at Wimbledon at 8:14, then nonstop to Waterloo arriving at 8:25 at platform 13. The headcode was 42 and it was composed of 4SUB or EPB stock.

Typically, it crawled through Raynes Park waiting for a signal to clear following an overtaking steam train on the fast line. Very occasionally it was forced to stop at Raynes Park, which with the slam door train stock required it to stop there formally and take on passengers who were only too happy to take advantage of a rare fast service destined for the main line.

Connections
London Buses route K2 and school route 665 serve the station.

References

External links

Railway stations in the Royal Borough of Kingston upon Thames
Railway stations in Great Britain opened in 1933
Former Southern Railway (UK) stations
Railway stations served by South Western Railway